ABRC may refer to:
 Arabidopsis Biological Resource Center, the American collection and distribution organization for the Arabidopsis plant, located at Ohio State University
 Ada Byron Research Center, a research center associated with the Donald Bren School of Information and Computer Sciences, at the University of California, Irvine